D26 may refer to:

Ships 
 , an Allen M. Sumner-class destroyer of the Argentine Navy
 , a Gearing-class destroyer of the Brazilian Navy
 , a Ruler-class escort carrier of the Royal Navy
 , a W-class destroyer of the Royal Navy

Other uses 
 D26 road (Croatia)
 Dewoitine D.26, a French military trainer aircraft 
 IVL D.26 Haukka I, a Finnish prototype fighter aircraft
 LNER Class D26, a class of British steam locomotives